Petra Senánszky (born 10 January 1994) is a Hungarian swimmer. She competed in the women's 4 × 100 metre freestyle relay event at the 2020 European Aquatics Championships, in Budapest, Hungary, reaching the final.

References

External links
 

1994 births
Living people
Hungarian female swimmers
Hungarian female freestyle swimmers
Place of birth missing (living people)
Competitors at the 2013 World Games
Competitors at the 2017 World Games
Competitors at the 2022 World Games
World Games gold medalists
World Games silver medalists
20th-century Hungarian women
21st-century Hungarian women